The 1992 7-Up Bottlers season was the third season of the franchise in the Philippine Basketball Association (PBA). Known as Pepsi Bottlers in the First Conference.

Draft picks

Notable dates
March 7: Kenny Redfield, who was originally a replacement import for Presto's Derwin Collins, debuted with 39 points and 24 rebounds that gave the Bottlers a 110-105 win over Ginebra San Miguel in the out-of-town game in Lucena City. It was the first win in seven games for the Bottlers with Redfield replacing Mark Stevenson after Pepsi lost their first six outings in the First Conference. 

July 14: Seven-Up ripped Alaska Milk, 95-77, for their sixth win in 10 games in the All-Filipino Conference as the Bottlers makes it to the semifinal round for only the second time in their franchise history.  

July 26: The Bottlers ended the seven-game winning streak of league-leading Purefoods TJ Hotdogs in a 112-99 victory and improved their standings to eight wins and four losses. 

July 28: Seven-Up turned back Swift Mighty Meaties, 108-99, for their third straight win in the semifinals of the All-Filipino Conference and moved within reach of a possible first-ever finals appearance.  

August 9: Eugene Quilban made an all-time record 28 assists in Seven-Up's 123-100 win over Shell.

December 3: Seven-Up reached the finals for the first time in three years of participation, defeating San Miguel Beermen, 102-91, for the right to play Swift Mighty Meaties for the Third Conference title.

Occurrences
On December 1, which was the last scheduled semifinal double-header of the Third Conference, 7-Up won over Swift in a high-scoring contest, 156-154. The Bottlers' victory ousted crowd-favorite Ginebra San Miguel from the finals race. Had Swift, which already clinch the first finals seat, won in that first game, a Ginebra victory over San Miguel Beermen in the second game would have assured the Ginebras a playoff for one of the two finals berth. PBA Commissioner Rey Marquez fined both the Mighty Meaties and Bottlers P100,000 for their players' unusual conduct in that game.

First finals stint
In the Third Conference, 7-Up's original choice for their import Melvin Newbern played three games and led his team to one victory. Newbern put in numbers of 51, 70 and 59 points for an average of 60 points per game and despite that, players voted in favor of a replacement and coming in is Delano Demps. 

The Bottlers made it to the championship round for the first time in their franchise history and will go up against the Swift Mighty Meaties after winning over San Miguel Beermen in their playoff game on December 3. Seven-Up got swept in four games by a much stronger Swift squad led by their super import Tony Harris and became the second team to lose in the finals series via four-game sweep.

Roster

Transactions

Trades

Additions

Recruited imports

References

TNT Tropang Giga seasons
7-Up